Lietzke is a surname. Notable people with the surname include:

Bruce Lietzke (1951–2018), American golfer
Lisa Lietzke, fictional character